Kim Dae-yeong (also known as Kim Dae-young, born 16 March 1975) is a South Korean former sailor. He competed at the 1996 Summer Olympics, the 2000 Summer Olympics, and the 2004 Summer Olympics.

References

External links
 
 

1975 births
Living people
South Korean male sailors (sport)
Olympic sailors of South Korea
Sailors at the 1996 Summer Olympics – 470
Sailors at the 2000 Summer Olympics – 470
Sailors at the 2004 Summer Olympics – 470
Asian Games gold medalists for South Korea
Asian Games bronze medalists for South Korea
Asian Games medalists in sailing
Sailors at the 1998 Asian Games
Sailors at the 2002 Asian Games
Sailors at the 2006 Asian Games
Sailors at the 2010 Asian Games
Medalists at the 1998 Asian Games
Medalists at the 2002 Asian Games
Medalists at the 2006 Asian Games
Medalists at the 2010 Asian Games
Place of birth missing (living people)